In the season 2007–08, Olympiacos was considered amongst the favourites to reach the Final Four of the EuroLeague. It is also considered the favourite along with Panathinaikos in the A1 Ethniki. In the Regular Season the team had the record of 22 wins and 4 defeats, having produced the second most offensive basketball in the Greek League. For the Quarter-finals of the Playoffs, Olympiacos swept AEK Athens in a best-of-three series and for the Semi-finals won Maroussi in a best-of-five series by 3-2. In the Finals of the Greek League Reds faced the eternal enemy Panathinaikos. Meanwhile, in Europe the team qualified for the third phase (quarter-finals) of the Euroleague, where it was eliminated by CSKA Moscow. Additionally, Olympiacos qualified to the Greek Cup Final, where they lost to the arch-rival Panathinaikos in a very impressive game, which was dramatic up to the last second.

A1 2007–08

Regular season
Last match

Play-offs

This is the outlook for the 2008 Α1 playoffs. Teams in bold advance to the next round.

Greek Cup 2007–08

Quarter-final

Semi-final

Final

Euroleague 2007–08

Regular season

Top 16

 Maccabi win the group on the second tiebreaker of head-to-head point differential against Olympiacos.

Quarter-finals

Last match

References

2008
2007–08 in Greek basketball
2007–08 Euroleague by club